Directorate of Secondary and Higher Education is a Bangladesh government Directorate under the Ministry of Education responsible for improving education standards and access to education. The Director General of the Directorate is Nehal Ahmed.

History
Directorate of Secondary and Higher Education traces its origins to the Directorate of Public Instruction, which was formed following the Wood's despatch in 1854. The government of Bangladesh converted the Directorate of Public Instruction to the Directorate of Secondary and Higher Education in 1981. The Directorate is responsible for 29569 educational institutes in Bangladesh.

References

1981 establishments in Bangladesh
Organisations based in Dhaka
Government agencies of Bangladesh
Government directorates of Bangladesh